GSAT-30 is a telecommunications satellite developed by the Indian Space Research Organisation (ISRO).

Mission 
The satellite's main communication payload is 12 Ku band transponders for covering Indian mainland and islands and 12 C-band transponders for extended coverage over Asia and Australia. The satellite will act as a replacement for the defunct INSAT-4A. The satellite provides advanced telecommunication services to the Indian subcontinent. It is used for Very-small-aperture terminal (VSAT) networks, television uplinks, digital satellite news gathering, Direct-broadcast satellite (DTH) services and other communication systems. This is the 41st communication satellite launched by ISRO and the 24th launch of ISRO satellite by Arianespace.

Satellite 
The satellite is based on ISRO's I-3K bus. It was assembled by a consortium of mid-sized industries led by Alpha Design Technologies Ltd. at ISRO Satellite Integration and Test Establishment at Bengaluru.

Launch 
GSAT-30 satellite was launched aboard Ariane 5 launch vehicle (VA251) from French Guiana on 21:05 UTC, 16 January 2020 or 02:35 IST, 17 January 2020. After three orbit raising burns with cumulative duration of 2 hours 29 minutes, GSAT-30 acquired station at 81° East on 25 January 2020.

The launch of the GSAT-30 and GSAT-31 by Arianespace is expected to cost Rs 950 crore.

References 

GSAT satellites
Communications satellites in geostationary orbit
Spacecraft launched by India in 2020
Ariane commercial payloads
Satellites of India
Communications satellites of India